Reagan Diana Wilson (born March 6, 1947) is an American model and actress who was Playboy magazine's Playmate of the Month for its October 1967 issue. Her centerfold was photographed by Ron Vogel.

Early life
Wilson was born in Torrance, California, and attended Roosevelt Elementary School in Santa Monica. After her parents' divorce, she relocated to Missoula, Montana with her mother, younger brother and sister.  She studied journalism at the University of Montana.

Career
Wilson began working as a model after relocating to Los Angeles, California in the late 1960s. She made her film debut in the 1970 horror film Blood Mania with fellow Playmate Vicki Peters, and later appeared in the 1973 film Running with the Devil. Wilson later relocated to New York City, where she did further modeling work, followed by jobs in Paris and London.

In 1968, Wilson appeared at a Men's Day event at the University of Washington in Seattle, which also featured a concert by Phil Ochs. Wilson was criticized for her appearance by feminist organizers, who chanted, "Reagan Wilson, you are an empty vessel" at the event.

In November 1969, a nude photo of Wilson made a trip to the Moon. As a joke, NASA ground staff hid a small nude photo of her  (along with fellow playmates Angela Dorian, Cynthia Myers and Leslie Bianchini) inside the schedule of Apollo 12's mission commander, Pete Conrad. A photograph of Pete Conrad in his spacesuit with the Lunar Module in the background can be enlarged to see her picture.  Pete Conrad was the third man to walk on the Moon.

Wilson again posed nude for Playboy for the December 1979 pictorial "Playmates Forever!"

Personal life
Wilson married Barry Hornig in 1987. The couple owns a textile rug company in Santa Monica, California.

Filmography

See also
 List of people in Playboy 1960–1969

Notes

References

External links 
 
 

1947 births
Actors from Torrance, California
Actresses from California
Actresses from Montana
American film actresses
Female models from Montana
Living people
University of Montana alumni
People from Missoula, Montana
1960s Playboy Playmates
20th-century American actresses
21st-century American women